Fleet chief petty officer is a non-commissioned naval rank, typically senior to chief petty officer and ranking with army warrant officers.

Pakistan
Fleet chief petty officer is a commissioned and gazetted rank in the Pakistan Navy above chief petty officer and below master chief petty officer. It is equivalent to the Pakistan Air Force warrant officer and the Pakistan Army subedar.

United Kingdom
From 1973, fleet chief petty officer, commonly known and addressed as "fleet chief", was also the highest non-commissioned rank in the British Royal Navy. It was equivalent to warrant officer class 1 in the British Army and Royal Marines and warrant officer in the Royal Air Force.  Fleet chief petty officers wore the same rank badge as their army and air force equivalents, the royal coat of arms. In 1985, it was replaced by the rank of warrant officer.

Pakistan Navy ranks
Military ranks of the Royal Navy
Warrant officers